Vanderlei Farias da Silva (born 1 February 1984), simply known as Vanderlei, is a Brazilian footballer who plays as a goalkeeper for Vila Nova.

Club career

Early career
Born in Porecatu, Paraná, Vanderlei made his senior debuts for locals Londrina in 2004. In 2006, he moved to Olímpia, appearing with the side in that year's Copa Paulista.

Vanderlei joined Paranavaí in January 2007. An undisputed starter for the side, he appeared in 24 matches as his side were champions of Campeonato Paranaense; he also kept two clean sheets in the final matches against Paraná.

Coritiba
On 8 May 2007 Vanderlei signed with Série B side Coritiba. He made his debut for the club four days later, starting in a 3–1 home win against Paulista. However, after the arrival of Édson Bastos, he acted mainly as a backup and appeared in only one further match, as his side returned to Série A after a three-year absence.

In mid-2008, after profiting from Bastos' injury, Vanderlei was handed a starting spot, which lasted until the former's return. He played his 100th match for the club on 2 October 2011, starting in a 0–0 away draw against Figueirense.

Vanderlei and Bastos shared spells as starters in the following campaigns. The latter left the club in 2012, and he was definitely appointed as the club's first-choice; he appeared in his 200th match for Coxa on 28 March 2013, in a 1–1 draw against Nacional.

On 30 November 2014 Vanderlei played his 300th match for Coxa, making several key stops in a 2–1 home win against Atlético Mineiro. He appeared in all league matches during the season as his side narrowly avoided relegation.

Vanderlei left Coritiba with 301 official appearances, being the eight with more appearances for the club overall.

Santos

On 23 January 2015 Vanderlei moved to fellow top level side Santos, after agreeing to a three-year contract. He made his debut for his new club on 8 February, starting in a 2–1 home win against Red Bull Brasil.

On 27 March 2015, Vanderlei suffered a facial injury in a 1–3 away loss against Ponte Preta, after colliding with Rildo. He subsequently underwent surgery, and was sidelined for three months, eventually losing his first-choice status to Vladimir.

After Vladimir's poor form, Vanderlei was again chosen as a first-choice in a 1–3 home loss against Grêmio. He finished the year as an undisputed starter, contributing with 28 league appearances.

Vanderlei was an important unit for Peixe during their 2016 Campeonato Paulista winning campaign, saving two penalties in the semifinals against Palmeiras. He made his 100th game for the club on 28 September of that year, starting in a 2–1 Copa do Brasil home win against Internacional.

On 20 January 2017, Santos' president Modesto Roma Júnior confirmed the extension of Vanderlei's contract until December 2020. He made his Copa Libertadores debut on 19 April, starting in a 0–0 away draw against Independiente Santa Fe.

Vanderlei played his 200th match for Peixe on 6 June 2018, starting in a 1–1 away draw against Corinthians. During the 2019 season, under new manager Jorge Sampaoli, he lost his starting spot to new signing Everson.

Grêmio
On 18 January 2020, Vanderlei was announced at fellow first division side Grêmio, after agreeing to a two-year deal.

Career statistics

Honours

Club
Paranavaí
Campeonato Paranaense: 2007

Coritiba
Campeonato Brasileiro Série B: 2007, 2010
Campeonato Paranaense: 2008, 2010, 2011, 2012, 2013

Santos
Campeonato Paulista: 2015, 2016

Grêmio
Campeonato Gaúcho: 2020

Individual
Campeonato Paulista Team of the year: 2016
Bola de Prata: 2017
Campeonato Brasileiro Team of the year: 2017
Campeonato Brasileiro Série A most clean sheets: 2017

References

External links
Santos official profile 

1984 births
Living people
Sportspeople from Paraná (state)
Brazilian footballers
Association football goalkeepers
Campeonato Brasileiro Série A players
Campeonato Brasileiro Série B players
Londrina Esporte Clube players
Atlético Clube Paranavaí players
Coritiba Foot Ball Club players
Santos FC players
Grêmio Foot-Ball Porto Alegrense players